The International Social Service (ISS) is an international non-governmental organization (NGO) founded in 1924. It provides assistance in resolving international child protection cases.

The ISS is organised as a global network of over 120 countries which assist children and families confronted with complex social problems as a result of migration. This is in addition to a General Secretariat based in Geneva.

The ISS is accredited to the United Nations Economic and Social Council (ECOSOC).

History 
The ISS was founded as the 'International Migration Service' in 1924. It was initially established in London by the World YWCA under the Chairmanship of Lady Dorothy Gladstone. Its headquarters moved from London to Geneva in 1925, where it has remained since.

Present day 
The ISS aims to ensure that respect for human rights is accorded to every individual across international borders, especially children. As such, it is concerned with a number of areas, including:
 Forced migrations (child trafficking, conflict, wars, asylum)
 Voluntary migrations
 International adoptions
 Child abduction (inter-country divorce or separation)
 Unaccompanied/orphan child (death or separation)
The services which ISS provides include:
 Inter-country social and legal assistance
 Family tracing
 Pre- and post-adoption assistance
 International family mediation
 Child protection in family separation
 Protection and care of unaccompanied minors
 Alternative/foster care
 Search of origins

Structure 
The ISS is a global network spanning over 120 countries. These consist of 'Branches', 'Affiliated Bureaus' and 'Correspondents'. Prominent members exist in Australia, Canada, Germany, Hong Kong, Switzerland, UK (known as Children and Families Across Borders) and the US.

The organisations that the ISS collaborates with include:
 National and local child protection agencies
 National and local governments and courts
 NGOs with similar mission and activities 
 Family support services
 Public and private immigration services
 Public and private missing children agencies
 Individual social service practitioners 
 Law enforcement agencies, practitioners and firms
 Mediation practitioners
 Psychology and health practitioners

References

External links
ISS Global Network:

 Australia 
 Bulgaria
 Canada
 Germany (Berlin)
 Hong Kong
 Japan
 Netherlands
 Switzerland
 United States

International charities
Organizations established in 1924
Child welfare